The Budryk coal mine is a large mine in the south of Poland in Ornontowice, Silesian Voivodeship, 320 km south-west of the capital, Warsaw. Budryk represents one of the largest coal reserve in Poland having estimated reserves of 235.5 million tonnes of coal. The annual coal production is around 5 million tonnes.

References

External links 
 Official site

Coal mines in Poland
Mikołów County
Coal mines in Silesian Voivodeship